Home Cookin is an album by the American jazz organist Jimmy Smith of performances recorded in 1958 and 1959 and released on the Blue Note label. The album was rereleased on CD with five bonus tracks.

Reception

The AllMusic review by Lindsay Planer states: "The Hammond organ mastery of Jimmy Smith is arguably nowhere as profound as on this collection... Jimmy Smith's voluminous catalog is remarkably solid throughout and Home Cookin is a recommended starting place for burgeoning enthusiasts as well as a substantial entry for the initiated". The Penguin Guide to Jazz placed this album by Smith among those it regarded as "formulaic"; but highlighted the presence of Burrell and concluded that it was "A solid one".

Track listing
All compositions by Jimmy Smith, except as indicated

 "See See Rider" (Ma Rainey) – 6:35
 "Sugar Hill" (Kenny Burrell) – 5:19
 "I Got a Woman" (Ray Charles, Renald Richard) – 3:55
 "Messin' Around" – 5:55
 "Gracie" – 5:54
 "Come on Baby" (Burrell) – 6:50
 "Motorin' Along" (Jimmy McGriff) – 5:09

Bonus tracks on CD reissue:
"Since I Fell for You" (Buddy Johnson) – 4:19
 "Apostrophe" (Percy France) – 6:35
 "Groanin'" (Jack McDuff) – 8:10
 "Motorin' Along" [alternate take] (McGriff) – 5:02
 "Since I Fell for You" [alternate take] (Johnson) – 6:27

Recorded on July 15, 1958 (tracks 7, 8, 11, 12), May 24, 1959 (tracks 3, 10) and June 16, 1959 (tracks 1, 2, 4-6 & 9).

Personnel

Musicians
Jimmy Smith – organ
Percy France – tenor saxophone (tracks 1, 4-6 & 9)
Kenny Burrell – guitar
Donald Bailey – drums

Technical
 Alfred Lion – producer
 Rudy Van Gelder – engineer
 Reid Miles – design
 Francis Wolff – photography
 Ira Gitler – liner notes

References

Blue Note Records albums
Jimmy Smith (musician) albums
1961 albums
Albums produced by Alfred Lion
Albums recorded at Van Gelder Studio